Ven. Guo Xing Fa Shi (born 1953) is one of the Dharma heirs of Ch'an (Zen) Master Sheng-yen. He was born in Taiwan and ordained as a monk in 1986 after previously studying Ch'an under Master Sheng-yen for about two years. Since then he committed himself to service in the Dharma Drum Mountain sangha. He entered solitary retreat in Thailand in 1991. He also studied Theravada meditation in that country. After returning to Taiwan, he resumed service at Dharma Drum Mountain.

For 20 years he assisted Master Sheng-yen in leading at least fifty meditation retreats in Taiwan, Southeast Asia, and the United States. These included the first 49-day retreat at Dharma Drum Retreat Center at Pine Bush, New York in 2000 – in which Master Sheng-yen passed his Dharma transmission to two of his prominent Western disciples, Dr Simon Child and Max Kalin. He has served in various posts and offices in the Dharma Drum Mountain organization, including meditation counselor at Nung Chan Monastery in Taiwan, guiding instructor at Dharma Drum Sangha University, and director of Dharma Drum Mountain's Ch'an Hall.

Currently he is a resident teacher and abbot of Dharma Drum Retreat Center. He speaks Taiwanese, Mandarin, and English.

See also
 Master Sheng-yen
 Dharma Drum Retreat Center
 Dharma Drum Mountain

References

External links
 Dharma Drum Retreat Center (New York) official website
 Guo Xing Fashi 3-day retreat

Dharma Drum Mountain
Chan Buddhist monks
Living people
1953 births